Waldkraiburg is a town in the district of Mühldorf, in Bavaria, Germany with a population of about 24,000. It is the biggest town in the district of Mühldorf. It is located on the river Inn, approximately ten kilometers southwest of Mühldorf and sixty kilometers east of Munich.
Waldkraiburg is one of the Bavarian displaced person cities. During World War II, an armour factory fabricated gunpowder in this area. The remaining bunkers were soon used as makeshift housing for displaced persons from Sudetenland and Bohemia.

Officially founded on April 1, 1950, the community grew fast and, in 1960, it was granted the rights of a town.
Today, chemical and engine building factories are located in Waldkraiburg.

Sport clubs and other associations

 EHC Waldkraiburg
 EC Grizzly's
 Runningclub LC Bayern
 Motorclub Waldkraiburg in the ADAC
 Rock'n Roll & Boogie-Club "Hot Socks"
 Shooting Club Waldkraiburg
 Squashclub Waldkraiburg
 Diving Club TC Manta
 Dancing Club Weiß-Blau 70 e.V. Waldkraiburg
 VfL Waldkraiburg

Partner cities
  Sartrouville, France

Notable people
  (1880–1976), in Waldkraiburg; he was a German painter
 Emilie Schindler is buried in Waldkraiburg; She was the wife of Oskar Schindler
 Peter Maffay grew up in Waldkraiburg

Sons and daughters of the city

 Julia Mürkens: January 1, 2007; she was invested "Miss Bayern"

References

Mühldorf (district)
Populated places on the Inn (river)